Worst Friends is a 2009 South Korean short film starring Kim Soo-hyun. Its directorial intention is a retrospective of losing a friend in delirious Seoul. Directed and written by Namkoong Sun was made at the Korea National University of Arts' Department of Film Graduation Workshop.

Plot 
Jun-ki (Kim Soo-hyun), a boy with shaggy hair that covers his face, returns to Korea from an unsuccessful American educational trip. When the 19 year old In-sun hears that her first ever intimate experience partner is coming back, she is thrilled.

Cast 
Kim Soo-hyun as Jun-ki 
Bae Hye-mi as In-sun 
Kim Eun-mi as No-vak
Jung So-min as Mang 
Choi Jeong-nam as Jun-ki's Mother 
Go Chan-bin as Hyun-jin 
Kim Seong-woo as Older Hyun-jin

Accolades

Awards

Screenings

References 

2009 films
South Korean short films
2000s Korean-language films
2009 short films